The Grand Valley Local School District is a public school district in Ashtabula County, Ohio, United States, based in Orwell, Ohio.

Schools
The Grand Valley Local School District has one elementary school, one middle school, and one high school.

Elementary school 
Grand Valley Elementary School

Middle school
Grand Valley Middle School

High school
Grand Valley High School

References

External links

Education in Ashtabula County, Ohio
School districts in Ohio